Omorgus semicostatus is a species of hide beetle in the subfamily Omorginae.

References

semicostatus
Beetles described in 1871